Alem is a town in the Dutch province of Gelderland.

Alem may also refer to:

People
 Alem (name), both a surname and a given name
 Alem (beatboxer)
 Além (footballer), Angolan footballer

Places
 Ålem, a locality in Kalmar county, Sweden
 Além, a village in the Portuguese province of Norte

Other
 Alem (Ferris wheel), at Alem Cultural and Entertainment Center, Ashgabat, Turkmenistan
 Alem (finial), the decorative top of a minaret, or Ottoman military standard